Rigault de Genouilly (PG-80) was a  of the French Navy. She was designed to operate from French colonies in Africa, Asia, and the Pacific Ocean. During World War II, Rigault de Genouilly served on the side of the Allies until June 1940, and then in the naval forces of Vichy France. She was sunk in July 1940.

Design, construction, and commissioning

Rigault de Genouilly was laid down at Forges et Chantiers de la Gironde on the Gironde estuary in Lormont, France, on 7 July 1931. Launched on 18 September 1932, she was commissioned on 14 March 1934.

Rigault de Genouilly carried a three-seat floatplane — a Gourdou-Leseurre GL-810 HY, Gourdou-Leseurre GL-811 HY, or Gourdou-Leseurre GL-832 HY, according to different sources — which could conduct reconnaissance, surveillance, and search-and-rescue missions. The aircraft was designed to be catapulted from larger ships, but Rigault de Genouilly had no catapult and instead lowered the plane onto the sea with a crane.

Service history

Pre-World War II
Soon after her commissioning, Rigault de Genouilly departed in March 1934 on a cruise to Easter Island, where she arrived on 24 July 1934 and disembarked a scientific mission from the National Museum of Natural History.

In March 1938, a small group of sailors ordered to join Rigault de Genouilly′s crew began a voyage aboard the cargo ship Ville d'Amiens from Marseilles, France, bound for Nouméa on Grande Terre in New Caledonia, where they reported aboard Rigault de Genouilly on 13 March 1938. Rigault de Genouilly then departed Nouméa for Port Vila on Efate in the New Hebrides, from which she conducted an exercise with the training cruiser . She resumed her cruise and arrived at Papeete on Tahiti in French Polynesia on 15 June 1938. Repainted in gray, she next proceeded to Sydney, Australia.

On 20 February 1939, Rigault de Genouilly began a deployment in the Far East when she departed for Saigon in French Indochina. After the aviso  relieved her on the French Indochina station, Rigault de Genouilly visited Shanghai, China.

World War II

French Navy 
World War II began on 1 September 1939 with the German invasion of Poland. France entered the war on the side of the Allies on 3 September 1939. On 10 October 1939, Rigault de Genouilly began a deployment in the Indian Ocean. She changed crews on 6 March 1940 at Diego Suarez on Madagascar.

German ground forces advanced into France on 10 May 1940, beginning the Battle of France. Italy declared war on France on 10 June 1940 and joined the invasion. The Battle of France ended in France's defeat and its armistice of 22 June 1940 with Germany and Italy, which went into effect on 25 June 1940.

Vichy France
After France′s surrender, Rigault de Genouilly served in the naval forces of Vichy France. She was based at Oran in Algeria on 3 July 1940, when the British began Operation Catapult, which sought to seize or neutralize the ships of the French Navy to prevent their use by the Axis Powers. The Royal Navy′s Force H arrived off the French naval base at Mers El Kébir near Oran that day and demanded that the French Navy either turn over the ships based there to British custody or disable them. When the French refused, the British warships opened fire on the French ships in the harbor at 17:57, beginning their attack on Mers-el-Kébir. The French battleship  managed to put to sea from Mers El Kébir and make for Toulon, France. Rigault de Genouilly quickly got underway and attempted to join Strasbourg′s escort, but lacked the speed to keep up with the battleship and turned back for Oran.

As Rigault de Genouilly headed back to Oran, she encountered the ships of Force H, which were in pursuit of Strasbourg, at 19:33. Rigault de Genouilly steamed toward the British battlecruiser . Rigault de Genouilly fired nineteen  shells in return before taking a hit from Enterprise and withdrawing. Focused on their attempt to catch Strasbourg, the British did not pursue Rigault de Genouilly after the brief exchange of gunfire.

Loss
On 4 July 1940, the British submarine  sighted the damaged Rigault de Genouilly along the Algerian coast off Algiers near Cap Matifou. Mistaking her for a cruiser, Pandora torpedoed and sank her with the loss of 12 lives. The British Admiralty apologized to the French Embassy for the sinking.

References

Bibliography

External links
 École Navale : Espace tradition (in French)
 Aviso colonial "Rigault de Genouilly" (in French)
 Classe Bougainville sur La guerre du Millénaire (in French)
 Site web consacré au BTS Bougainville / Marine Nationale (in French)
 Mers-el-Kebir et Ploudalmezeau (in French)
 Mémoire des équipages de marines de guerre ... (in French)

Bougainville-class avisos
Ships built in France
1932 ships
Maritime incidents in July 1940
Ships sunk by British submarines
World War II shipwrecks in the Mediterranean Sea